Morck is a surname. Notable people with the surname include:

Fredrikke Mørck (1861–1934), Norwegian feminist, editor and teacher
Martin Mörck (born 1955), Norwegian artist
Niels-Peter Mørck (born 1990), Danish football player
Olof Mörck (born 1981), Swedish guitarist and songwriters
Sidsel Mørck (born 1937), Norwegian poet and novelist